Orange County Public Schools (OCPS) is the public school district for Orange County, Florida. It is based in the Ronald Blocker Educational Leadership Center in downtown Orlando. As of the 2021-22 school year, OCPS has an enrollment of 206,246 students, making it the 9th largest school district in the United States and the fourth largest in Florida.  The school district also employs over 24,576 instructional and classified employees, which make up more than 95% of the OCPS work force. It includes the entire county.

School board 
The superintendent of Orange County Public Schools is Maria Vazquez. The position of superintendent is appointed by the school board.  The district is overseen by the Orange County School Board, a body of seven elected officers, each board member sitting for a particular geographic district. School board districts are not analogous in any way with county commission districts. As of 2022, the current school board members, in order of district number, are Angie Gallo, Maria Salamanca, Alicia Farrant, Pam Gould, Vicki-Elaine Felder, Karen Castor Dentel, and Melissa Byrd.

Board members are elected every four years with 12-year term limits  as of July 1st, 2022, with Districts 1 through 3 elected during midterm election cycles (next in 2026) and Districts 4 through 7 elected during presidential cycles (next in 2024). School board elections in Orange County are non-partisan.

A county-wide public vote in 2009 created the elected position of school board chairman.  Bill Sublette was subsequently elected to this position in 2010 and was re-elected in 2014. Teresa Jacobs was elected in 2018 and re-elected in 2022.

Schools 
OCPS has used an attendance model of kindergarten through grade 5 for elementary schools, grades 6–8 for middle school and grades 9–12 for high school since July 1987. Before then, grade 6 was part of elementary school and grade 9 was part of middle school ("junior high" in OCPS prior to July 1987). As now required by Florida law, virtually all elementary schools have pre-kindergarten programs.

OCPS has 205 regular-attendance schools as of the 2021-22 school year: 128 elementary, nine K–8, 39 middle, 22 high, and seven exceptional student education centers. The district also has an adult education system with six dedicated campuses and night classes at most high schools, four dedicated special education schools as well as a hospital/homebound program, and dozens of alternative education centers, including charter schools. Six of the high schools in OCPS have separate ninth-grade centers, three of them off-site of the main campus, built after the shift from K–6/7–9/10–12 to K–5/6–8/9–12.

Some elementary middle and high schools include magnet programs that allow students to specialize in particular subject areas. Students must apply to magnet schools in order to take advantage of this specialization. Some magnet programs offered by OCPS are agriscience, aviation and aerospace, Cambridge AICE, criminal justice, culinary arts, digital media & gaming, education, entertainment production, entrepreneurship, finance, fine arts, first responders, foreign languages / dual languages, gifted academy, International Baccalaureate, international studies, healthcare, hospitality, laser photonics, law, leadership, medicine, nursing, performing arts, STEM (science, technology, engineering, mathematics), veterinary animal science, and visual arts.

The schools of OCPS are divided into six areas called learning communities: North, East, West, Southeast, Southwest and School Transformation Office (STO). Southeast and Southwest were split from a larger South Learning Community in 2006. The School Transformation Office Learning Community, which was founded in 2013, includes schools throughout Orange County who have received failing grades and helps provide resources for students at these schools to succeed. Prior to the existence of STO, there was a Central Learning Community, which was known as the "Urban Cohort" until 2005.

The district is in an aggressive expansion and school improvement project being fueled by a 0.5% sales tax option passed by the voters of Orange County in 2002. Skyrocketing land and materials costs, however, have outpaced faster-than-expected sales tax revenue increases and slowed progress. Many projects had been pushed back, and some had been cancelled altogether. An extension of the half-penny sales tax was passed in 2014 for another ten years.

Most paperwork distributed to students and parents by OCPS is available in both English and Spanish. Many such documents are also available in Portuguese, Vietnamese, Haitian Creole, Arabic, and Filipino due to the significant populations in Orange County that speak each language.

Elementary schools 

 Aloma Elementary School
 Andover Elementary School
 Apopka Elementary School
 Avalon Elementary School
 Azalea Park Elementary School
 Baldwin Park Elementary School
 Bay Lake Elementary School
 Bay Meadows Elementary School
 Bonneville Elementary School
 Brookshire Elementary School
 Camelot Elementary School
 Castle Creek Elementary School
 Castleview Elementary School
 Catalina Elementary School
 Cheney Elementary School
 Chickasaw Elementary School
 Citrus Elementary School
 Clay Springs Elementary School
 Columbia Elementary School
 Conway Elementary School
 Cypress Park Elementary School
 Cypress Springs Elementary School
 Deerwood Elementary School 
 Dillard Street Elementary School
 Dommerich Elementary School
 Dover Shores Elementary School
 Dr. Phillips Elementary School
 Dream Lake Elementary School
 Durrance Elementary School
 Eagle Creek Elementary School
 Eagles Nest Elementary School
 East Lake Elementary School
 Eccleston Elementary School
 Endeavor Elementary School
 Engelwood Elementary School
 Forsyth Woods Elementary School
 Frangus Elementary School
 Hamlin Elementary School (2022)
 Hiawassee Elementary School
 Hidden Oaks Elementary School
 Hillcrest Elementary School
 Hungerford Elementary School
 Hunters Creek Elementary School 
 Independence Elementary School
 Ivey Lane Elementary School
 John Young Elementary School 
 Keenes Crossing Elementary School
 Killarney Elementary School
 Lake Gem Elementary School
 Lake George Elementary School
 Lake Silver Elementary School
 Lake Sybelia Elementary School
 Lake Weston Elementary School
 Lake Whitney Elementary School
 Lakemont Elementary School
 Lakeville Elementary School 
 Lancaster Elementary School
 Laureate Park Elementary School
 Lawton Chiles Elementary School
 Little River Elementary School
 Lockhart Elementary School
 Lovell Elementary School
 Maxey Elementary School
 McCoy Elementary School
 Meadow Woods Elementary School
 MetroWest Elementary School
 Millennia Elementary School
 Millennia Gardens Elementary School
 Mollie Ray Elementary School
 Moss Park Elementary School
 Northlake Park Community Elementary School
 Oak Hill Elementary School
 Oakshire Elementary School
 Ocoee Elementary School
 Orange Center Elementary School
 Orlo Vista Elementary School
 Palm Lake Elementary School
 Palmetto Elementary School
 Panther Lake Elementary School (2022)
 Pinar Elementary School
 Pine Hills Elementary School
 Pineloch Elementary School
 Pinewood Elementary School 
 Prairie Lake Elementary School
 Princeton Elementary School
 Ridgewood Park Elementary School
 Riverdale Elementary School
 Riverside Elementary School 
 Rock Lake Elementary School
 Rock Springs Elementary School
 Rolling Hills Elementary School
 Rosemont Elementary School 
 Sadler Elementary School
 Sally Ride Elementary School
 Sand Lake Elementary School
 Shenandoah Elementary School
 Shingle Creek Elementary School
 Southwood Elementary School
 Spring Lake Elementary School
 Stone Lakes Elementary School
 Stonewyck Elementary School (2022)
 Summerlake Elementary School
 Sun Blaze Elementary School
 SunRidge Elementary School
 Sunrise Elementary School 
 Sunset Park Elementary School 
 Sunshine Elementary School
 Tangelo Park Elementary School
 Thornebrooke Elementary School
 Three Points Elementary School
 Tildenville Elementary School
 Timber Lakes Elementary School
 Union Park Elementary School
 Ventura Elementary School
 Village Park Elementary School
 Vista Lakes Elementary School
 Vista Pointe Elementary School
 Washington Shores Elementary School
 Washington Shores Primary Learning Center
 Water Spring Elementary School
 Waterbridge Elementary School
 Waterford Elementary School
 West Creek Elementary School
 West Oaks Elementary School
 Westbrooke Elementary School
 Westpointe Elementary School
 Wetherbee Elementary School
 Wheatley Elementary School
 Whispering Oak Elementary School
 Windermere Elementary School 
 Winegard Elementary School
 Wolf Lake Elementary School
 Wyndham Lakes Elementary School
 Zellwood Elementary School

K-8 Schools 

 Arbor Ridge K-8 School
 Audubon Park K-8 School
 Baldwin Park K-8 School
 Blankner K-8 School
 Kelly Park K-8 School (2022)
 Lake Como K-8 School
 OCPS Academic Center for Excellence (ACE)
 Orlando Gifted Academy
 Pershing K-8 School
 Wedgefield K-8 School
 Windy Ridge K-8 School

Middle schools 

 Apopka Memorial Middle School
 Avalon Middle School
 Bridgewater Middle School
 Carver Middle School
 Chain Of Lakes Middle School
 College Park Middle School
 Conway Middle School
 Corner Lake Middle School
 Discovery Middle School
 Freedom Middle School
 Glenridge Middle School
 Gotha Middle School
 Hamlin Middle School (2022)
 Horizon West Middle School
 Howard Middle School
 Hunters Creek Middle School
 Innovation Middle School
 Judson B. Walker Middle School
 Lake Nona Middle School
 Lakeview Middle School
 Legacy Middle School
 Liberty Middle School
 Lockhart Middle School
 Maitland Middle School
 Meadow Woods Middle School
 Meadowbrook Middle School
 Memorial Middle School
 Ocoee Middle School
 Odyssey Middle School
 Piedmont Lakes Middle School
 Roberto Clemente Middle School
 Robinswood Middle School
 South Creek Middle School
 Southwest Middle School
 SunRidge Middle School
 Timber Springs Middle School
 Union Park Middle School
 Water Spring Middle School
 Westridge Middle School
 Wolf Lake Middle School

High schools 
Prior to 1952, there were only two high schools in the City of Orlando: Orlando High School and Jones High School, which was a segregation-era Black-only high school until integration was enforced. Other municipalities in the county had high schools: Apopka, Florida; Winter Park, Florida; Ocoee, Florida; Winter Garden, Florida (Lakeview H.S.), and Eatonville, Florida (Hungerford H.S.).

In 1952, Orlando High was split into what became Edgewater High School and William R. Boone High School. Originally to be named "Orlando North" and "Orlando South", respectively, Orlando South took its modern name after its principal, William R. Boone, died before it opened. Orlando North took the name of the road it was built on, Edgewater Drive. The former Orlando High campus became Howard Middle School. Jones High moved to its present location in 1952, which was reconstructed in 2004.

In 1975, Ocoee High School and Lakeview High School were closed (their old campuses then housed Junior High schools of the same names) and their students went to the new West Orange High School.  30 years later, a new Ocoee High School was built and opened in 2005.

Robert F. Hungerford High School, founded in 1897 in the historically black community of Eatonville, was renamed Wymore Tech and Wymore Career Education Center in the 1960's until it became the Hungerford Preparatory School in the late 1990's and operated as a district-wide magnet school without a specific geographic attendance zone.  OCPS closed Hungerford Prep in 2009.
  
Twelve of the district's high schools were opened after 1990, not including reconstructed campuses for existing schools.

 Apopka High School (1931)
 William R. Boone High School (1952)
 Colonial High School (1958)
 Cypress Creek High School (1992)
 Dr. Phillips High School (1987)
 East River High School (2009)
 Edgewater High School (1952)
 Maynard Evans High School (1955)
 Freedom High School (2003)
 Horizon High School (2021)
 Jones High School (1895)
 Lake Buena Vista High School (2021)
 Lake Nona High School (2009)
 Oak Ridge High School (1959)
 Ocoee High School (2005)
 Olympia High School (2001)
 Timber Creek High School (2001)
 University High School (1990)
 Wekiva High School (2007)
 West Orange High School (1975)
 Windermere High School (2017)
 Winter Park High School (1927)

Exceptional Education Schools 

 ESE Transition
 Esteem Academy
 Hospital Homebound
 La Amistad
 Magnolia
 Silver Pines Academy

Alternative Education Schools 

 Acceleration East
 Acceleration West
 AMIKids Orlando
 Beta
 Devereux Treatment Program
 Juvenile Detention
 Juvenile Offenders Program
 OCVS Digital Academy
 OCVS Virtual Franchise
 OOCVS Virtual Instruction Program
 Orange Youth Academy
 Pace Center For Girls
 Positive Pathways Transition Center
 Project Compass
 Randall Academy
 Simon Youth Foundation Academy
 Universal Education Center
 Village

Charter Schools 

 Access
 Aloma High
 Aspire Academy 
 Bridgeprep Academy 
 Central Florida Leadership Academy
 Chancery High
 Cornerstone Academy
 Cornerstone Charter Academy High School
 Econ River High
 Hope Charter
 Innovation Montessori High School
 Innovation Montessori Ocoee
 Innovations Middle
 Lake Eola
 Legacy High
 Legends Academy
 Lucious and Emma Nixon Academy
 Mater Academy Narcoossee
 Oakland Avenue
 Orange County Preparatory Academy
 Orlando Science Schools
 Passport
 Pinecrest Academy Avalon
 Pinecrest Collegiate Academy
 Pinecrest Creek
 Pinecrest Preparatory
 Princeton House
 Prosperitas Leadership Academy
 Renaissance Charter at Crown Point
 Renaissance Charter at Chickasaw
 Renaissance Charter at Goldenrod
 Renaissance Charter at Hunter's Creek
 Sheeler High
 Sunshine High
 UCP Bailes Community Academy
 UCP East Orange
 UCP Orange
 UCP Pine Hills
 UCP Transitional Learning Academy
 UCP West Orange
 Workforce Advantage Academy

Footnotes

External links 

 
 Orange County Public Schools Nutrition Services Official Website
 Orange County Launchpad Student
 New OCPS District Site

 
School districts in Florida
Education in Orange County, Florida
Government agencies with year of establishment missing
Organizations based in Orlando, Florida